Danièle Giazzi (born 3 September 1955) is a French politician, the mayor of the 16th arrondissement of Paris between 2017 and 2020.

References

1955 births
Living people
Politicians from Paris
People from Lausanne
The Republicans (France) politicians
Chevaliers of the Légion d'honneur
Officers of the Ordre national du Mérite
French pharmacists
Mayors of arrondissements of Paris
Councillors of Paris